Malcolm John MacDonald  (17 August 1901 – 11 January 1981) was a British politician and diplomat. He was initially a Labour Member of Parliament (MP), but in 1931 followed his father Ramsay MacDonald in breaking with the party and joining the National Government, and was consequently expelled from the Labour Party. MacDonald was a government minister during the Second World War and was later Governor of Kenya.

Early life
MacDonald was born to future Prime Minister Ramsay MacDonald and Margaret MacDonald. Like his father, he was born in Lossiemouth, Moray. He was educated at Bedales School and Queen's College, Oxford. MacDonald was a successful member of his college debating team and in 1924 embarked on a debating tour of the United States and Australia.

Political career

Early career
MacDonald was first elected to Parliament for Bassetlaw in the 1929 general election and proved to be a "loyal" son, in contrast to Conservative leader Stanley Baldwin's son Oliver who was also elected a Labour MP. In 1931, the Labour government broke up and MacDonald's father formed the National Government, with representatives drawn from all political parties. Very few Labour members supported it, however, and so Malcolm was appointed to a junior ministerial post as Under-Secretary of State for Dominion Affairs.

When the Labour MPs met to discuss the formation of the government, Malcolm was the only person to speak in favour of his father's actions and to vote against a condemnatory resolution.

MacDonald held his seat in the 1931 general election as a National Labour candidate, and he continued to build up a reputation as a highly competent minister. When his father retired as prime minister in 1935, Stanley Baldwin as the successor appointed Malcolm to the Cabinet for the first time as Secretary of State for the Colonies. MacDonald senior at the same time became Lord President of the Council, and they became only the third father and son to sit together in the same Cabinet.

In the 1935 general election, which was held that autumn, MacDonald narrowly lost his seat. After some discussion, Baldwin decided to retain him in government but to move him to the post of Secretary of State for Dominion Affairs in a direct swap with James Henry Thomas, who had created problems with some Dominion governments.

In February, MacDonald stood for Parliament in a by-election at Ross and Cromarty. The election proved chaotic, as the local Conservative & Unionist Association declined to support him, unlike the local National Liberals, and instead adopted as its candidate Randolph Churchill, the son of Winston Churchill, who had emerged as a prominent Conservative critic of the government.

However, MacDonald won the by-election and returned to Parliament. MacDonald retained his position after Baldwin's and MacDonald's final retirements in 1937. With the new prime minister, Neville Chamberlain, MacDonald set about negotiating a new set of agreements with the Irish Free State to resolve disputes over trade, compensation and the Treaty Ports which the United Kingdom still retained. Although the issue of Northern Ireland could not be agreed, all other matters were settled, and MacDonald won many plaudits.

Palestine
In May 1938, Chamberlain moved him back to the Colonial Office, a move that was now seen as a promotion because of the increased prominence of the position, given the situation in the British Mandate of Palestine. In October, the new Dominions Secretary, Lord Stanley, died; given that this was a sensitive period for the work of the Dominions Office, and an experienced pair of hands was required for the post, MacDonald was appointed to succeed him, in addition to the post he already held. In January, he relinquished the Dominions Office.

In 1939, MacDonald oversaw and introduced the so-called MacDonald White Paper which aimed at the creation of a unified state in Palestine, with controls on Jewish immigration. The White Paper argued that since over 450,000 Jews had been settled in the Mandate, the terms of the Balfour Declaration had now been met and that an independent Jewish state should not be established. When the White Paper was debated in Parliament on 22–23 May 1939, many politicians objected to its central recommendations. Winston Churchill noted, '"After the period of five years no further Jewish immigration will be permitted unless the Arabs of Palestine are prepared to acquiesce in it". Now, there is the breach; there is the violation of the pledge; there is the abandonment of the Balfour Declaration; there is the end of the vision, of the hope, of the dream.' The League of Nations Permanent Mandates Commission held that the White Paper was in conflict with the terms of the Mandate that had been put forth.

The outbreak of the Second World War suspended any further deliberations. It has been suggested that MacDonald and Chamberlain took that course of action in order to ensure that the situation in Palestine did not develop into a situation like that of Ireland in which two evenly-matched communities engaged in a bitter ethnic conflict during a world war.

With anti-Semitism rampant in Europe, MacDonald vainly sought to find new settlements. The White Paper was bitterly opposed by the Jews in Palestine as well as by many supporting the National Government in Britain. When it was voted on in Parliament, many government supporters such as Churchill abstained or voted against the proposals, including some Cabinet Ministers.

Opponents of the White Paper pointed out that Jews were suffering from oppression by the Nazi regimes in Germany and Austria but, given that most states, including the United States and Canada, did not accept Jewish refugees, had nowhere other than Palestine to which to emigrate. In a UK Parliamentary debate, David Lloyd George called the White Paper "an act of perfidy."

In a leader, the Manchester Guardian called it "a death sentence on tens of thousands of Central European Jews", and the Liberal MP James Rothschild stated during the parliamentary debate that "for the majority of the Jews who go to Palestine it is a question of migration or of physical extinction".

Ireland
In May 1940, Chamberlain fell and Winston Churchill formed an all-party coalition, bringing the Labour Party into the National Government for the first time. There was some speculation that their hostility might result in MacDonald being amongst the ministers dropped to make way for them (as happened to Earl de la Warr, the other National Labour minister) but instead MacDonald was retained and became Minister of Health. In June 1940, he was sent to Dublin for a series of meetings with Éamon de Valera for which he was authorised to offer the end of the Partition of Ireland if the Free State would enter the war on the Allied side. De Valera declined the offer, instead trying to persuade MacDonald to authorise sale of small arms and artillery to Ireland. The British government refused, fearing that any weapons supplied to Ireland would be captured and swell the German army following a successful Nazi invasion.

Canada
The following year his career took a different turn when he was appointed High Commissioner to Canada. Initially special legislation was passed to allow him to retain his seat in Parliament, but in 1945 the National Labour Organisation dissolved itself and MacDonald decided to retire from British politics.

Southeast Asia
After his term in Canada ended in 1946, MacDonald moved on to serve in other Imperial posts based in Singapore: as Governor-General of British territories in Southeast Asia from 1946 to 1948 and then Commissioner-General for Southeast Asia covering regional affairs as well during the communist insurrection. MacDonald's expansive duties as Commissioner-General included co-ordinating British defence policy in the region, controlling British intelligence activities, and conducting both formal and informal diplomacy with regional heads of state such as Norodom Sihanouk of Cambodia. MacDonald was a popular appointment to Singapore, becoming a well-known member of the art and antiques circles and participating in social activities such as the China Society of Singapore. In his honour, the MacDonald House building was constructed in 1949 in Singapore and named after him. He served as Chancellor of the University of Malaya from 1949 to 1961. He also served as High Commissioner to India from 1955 to 1960.

Later career
He served as co-chairman of the Laos Conference from 1961 to 1962, and finally as Governor-General of Kenya between 1963 and 1964.

MacDonald received an Honorary Doctorate from Heriot-Watt University in 1973.

In his later years, he served as Chancellor of the University of Durham from 1971 to 1980.

Personal life
MacDonald was a keen ornithologist and, in 1934, published the book Bird Watching at Lossiemouth privately. It was, as he noted, in a brief foreword, an expanded version of a paper he read to the London Morayshire Club one evening in the autumn of 1933.

While High Commissioner to Canada, MacDonald undertook two extensive journeys, in a Grumman Goose, from Ottawa to the far northwest of Canada. He was accompanied by three senior Government officials, in August 1942 and March 1943. He chronicled the trips in a book, Down North (Oxford University Press, Toronto, 1943). The trips covered remote areas of Alberta, the Northwest Territories, the Yukon and British Columbia, going as far north as Aklavik. MacDonald's book gives a perspective of the history, geography and peoples of Canada's northwest.

MacDonald was a prolific art collector in a range of genres, most notably Chinese ceramics. He sold and donated art collections to museums across the world. His Chinese ceramic collections comprise a total of over 500 pieces with a chronological span of 2000 BCE to circa 1940 CE and incorporating representative examples of most styles of domestic and export ceramic wares. These collections are today split between the Oriental Museum of Durham University, the University of Malaya Museum of Asian Art in Kuala Lumpur and the National University of Singapore Museum in Singapore.

In December 1946, he married Audrey Marjorie Fellowes Rowley, a Canadian war widow. They had one child, daughter Fiona (married to Bob McElwain). MacDonald also adopted his wife's two children from her first marriage, Bill and Jane Rowley. Joseph Burkholder Smith, CIA agent in Singapore, recounted that MacDonald's flirtations with Chinese women caused Rowley to decamp back to Canada.

Death
MacDonald spent the last eleven years of his life at Raspit Hill, near Ightham in Kent. In 1981 at his home, when he went outside on a frosty night to make sure that his greenhouse was closed, he suffered a heart attack and died on 11 January 1981 at the age of 79. He was buried at his family plot at Spynie Cemetery, Morayshire in Scotland.

On 9 May 2015, his widow Audrey died of natural causes in Ottawa at the age of 99 years old, three weeks before her 100th birthday.

Writings
As a young man, MacDonald aspired to be a novelist but did not succeed in publishing any of his writings of fiction. He wrote a number of articles for British and Canadian newspapers in the 1920s, including a series describing his travels in Japan, China and Korea in 1929. Following the assumption of his diplomatic career in 1941, MacDonald began writing factual accounts of the people, places and wildlife he encountered. He authored the following published works:

 Down North (1943: a description of his travels as High Commissioner to Canada)
 Birds of Brewery Creek (1947: a bird-watching diary regarded by US Secretary of State John Foster Dulles as one of the best books on the subject of North American ornithology)
 Borneo People (1956: an account of MacDonald's friendship with the Dayak peoples of Borneo including Iban leader Temenggong Koh Anak Jubang)
 Angkor (1958: one of the first English-language and systematically photographed guides to the Cambodian temple complex at Angkor Wat)
 Birds in My Indian Garden (1960: containing many black-and-white images)
 Birds in the Sun (1962: a guide to the birds of South Asia, with colour photography by MacDonald's friend Christina Loke)
 Treasure of Kenya (1965: another collaboration with Christina Loke which aimed to attract support amongst a British audience for wildlife conservation in Kenya. This book attracted the gratitude of the Kenyan government for MacDonald's ecological commitment)
 People and Places (1969: an anecdotal autobiography)
 Titans and Others (1972: MacDonald's reflections on his friendships or associations with some of the key figures of the twentieth century, including Jomo Kenyatta and Norodom Sihanouk)
 Inside China (1980: partly an introductory history of China, but more an account of his travels through China between the 1920s and 1970s)
 The Pleasures and Pains of Collecting (2018: MacDonald's memoir as an art collector, rejected by his publisher in his lifetime but published posthumously by the Friends of the Oriental Museum, Durham University, and illustrating key objects from MacDonald's art collections)
 Constant Surprise (unpublished autobiography – held at Durham University Library Archives)

Notes

References

External links 

 
 

1901 births
1981 deaths
Anglo-Scots
British Secretaries of State for Dominion Affairs
British people of Scottish descent
Chancellors of Durham University
Children of prime ministers of the United Kingdom
Colonial governors and administrators of Kenya
Foreign Office personnel of World War II
Governors-General of Kenya
High Commissioners of the United Kingdom to Canada
High Commissioners of the United Kingdom to India
Labour Party (UK) MPs for English constituencies
Members of London County Council
Members of the Order of Merit
Members of the Parliament of the United Kingdom for Scottish constituencies
Members of the Privy Council of the United Kingdom
Ministers in the Churchill wartime government, 1940–1945
National Labour (UK) politicians
People educated at Bedales School
People from Lossiemouth
Secretaries of State for the Colonies
UK MPs 1929–1931
UK MPs 1931–1935
UK MPs 1935–1945
British travel writers
British memoirists
British art collectors
Ministers in the Chamberlain wartime government, 1939–1940
20th-century memoirists